Ziegenbock (Ziegen Bock) is a German amber lager brewed by Anheuser-Busch. It is billed as "for Texans by Texans," and distributed in Texas and nearby states. Ziegenbock is the German word for a billy goat.

Ziegenbock is marketed as a Texas brewed Bock-Style Beer (Import - Craft - Specialty) and positioned as a Texan beer to compete with Shiner Bock. Ziegenbock is brewed at Anheuser-Busch's Houston brewery. Like Shiner Bock and Amber Bock, it does not conform to the BJCP style guidelines for a Bock, either in terms of flavor profile or potency.

Ziegfest
Ziegfest is an annual music festival sponsored by Ziegenbock and its parent company, Anheuser-Busch. Ziegfest typically features Red Dirt musicians. There are typically several venues with the events scheduled around a month apart.

References

External links

Ziegfest

Anheuser-Busch beer brands